Zarephath may refer to the following :

 Places
 Alternative name for Ancient Phoenician city Sarepta, now Sarafand, Lebanon
 Zarephath, New Jersey in the United States

Other 
 Raising of the son of the widow of Zarephath
 Zarephath Wines

See also 
 Tzarfat